Frank Fletcher may refer to:
Frank Friday Fletcher (1855–1928), U.S. Navy admiral, namesake of the USS Fletcher (DD-445)
Frank Jack Fletcher (1885–1973), U.S. Navy admiral, namesake of the USS Fletcher (DD-992)
Frank Fletcher (baseball) (1891–1974), Philadelphia Phillies player
Frank D. Fletcher, Chief Officer of the SY Aurora during the Australasian Antarctic Expedition
Frank Morley Fletcher (1866–1950), British painter and printmaker
Frank Fletcher (footballer) (1874–1936), English footballer

See also 
Frank Fletcher Hamilton (1921–2008), Canadian politician
Francis Fletcher (1814–1871), pioneer of the U.S. state of Oregon
Francis Fletcher (priest) (c. 1555–c. 1619), Church of England priest who accompanied Sir Francis Drake on his circumnavigation of the world